Suzanne Laure Daneau (17 August 1901 – 30 November 1971), also known professionally by the pseudonym Luc Lalain, was a Belgian pianist and composer. Her work was part of the music event in the art competition at the 1924 Summer Olympics.

References

Further reading
 Éliane Gubin, Dictionnaire des femmes belges: XIXe et XXe siècles. Racine: Brussels 2006
 Académie Royale de Belgique: Suzanne Daneau
 Présence Compositrices: Suzanne Daneau (includes list of works)

External links
 

1901 births
1971 deaths
Belgian women composers
Olympic competitors in art competitions
Musicians from Tournai